The College of Engineering, Kidangoor (CEKGR)  is a college in Kidangoor, Kottayam, Kerala, India. It was founded in 2000/2001, as part of the Co-operative Academy of Professional Education (CAPE). CAPE was formed to establish educational institutions to provide education and training, research and development, and consultancy. The society is promoted by the Co-operation Department of the government of Kerala and is an autonomous society.

The institution functions on a no-profit no-loss basis, a system upheld by the Supreme Court of India. The AICTE has given approval for the conduct of the courses. The state government has sanctioned the 5 B.Tech degree courses.

Admission is through Central Counseling by the government of Kerala. Candidates are admitted based on the Common Entrance Examination. From 2003, 50% of the seats are treated as government seats, and the balance 35% as Management Quota. 15% of the seats are reserved for NRIs.

Courses
The college offers B.Tech (Bachelor of Technology) degrees in 6 streams as shown in the following table. The college also offers M.Tech in Wireless Technology.

An additional 10% of the total seats are given to lateral entry students in every discipline.

Campus Placements
A Career Guidance & Placement Cell operates in CEKGR with intention of enabling each student to achieve his/her dream profession.

The placement history for the past years are as follows.

See also
 Cochin University of Science and Technology
 List of Engineering Colleges in Kerala

References

External links
 Official website
  Alumni website
  Lumiere

Engineering colleges in Kerala
Universities and colleges in Kottayam district
Educational institutions established in 2000
2000 establishments in Kerala
Educational institutions established in 2001
2001 establishments in Kerala